is an island located in the inland sea of Japan, between Naoshima and Shōdoshima islands, and is part of Kagawa Prefecture.

Teshima is one of the locations of the Setouchi Triennale, also known as the Setouchi International Art Festival.

History
Teshima has been inhabited for 14,000 years.

The island was the subject of a scandal in which 600,000 tons of toxic waste were illegally dumped on the island. In 2000, after a 25-year legal battle, the waste was transported to Naoshima for processing.

The Teshima Art Museum opened on the island in 2010.

References

External links

 Tourist information
 Description of Teshima on the Setouchi International Art Festival web site

Islands of Kagawa Prefecture
Islands of the Seto Inland Sea